Eom Hye-won (born 8 September 1991) is a South Korean badminton player who specializes in doubles. She became a national representative since 2004, and was selected to join the national team in 2008. As a member of  the Korea National Sport University team, she was awarded as the best player by the Badminton Korea Association in 2011.

Career 
In 2008, she won a bronze medal at the World Junior Championships in the mixed doubles event partnered with Kim Gi-jung. She came to international prominence playing women's doubles with Jang Ye-na, with whom she reached the finals of the 2013 BWF World Championships, but Badminton Korea Association decided to let her concentrate on playing mixed doubles for the subsequent Asian Games, in Incheon, Korea.

Achievements

BWF World Championships 
Women's doubles

Mixed doubles

Asian Championships 
Mixed doubles

Summer Universiade 
Women's doubles

Mixed doubles

BWF World Junior Championships 
Mixed doubles

Asian Junior Championships 
Mixed doubles

BWF World Tour (3 titles, 1 runner-up) 
The BWF World Tour, which was announced on 19 March 2017 and implemented in 2018, is a series of elite badminton tournaments sanctioned by the Badminton World Federation (BWF). The BWF World Tour is divided into levels of World Tour Finals, Super 1000, Super 750, Super 500, Super 300, and the BWF Tour Super 100.

Mixed doubles

BWF Superseries (3 runners-up) 
The BWF Superseries, which was launched on 14 December 2006 and implemented in 2007, was a series of elite badminton tournaments, sanctioned by the Badminton World Federation (BWF). BWF Superseries levels were Superseries and Superseries Premier. A season of Superseries consisted of twelve tournaments around the world that had been introduced since 2011. Successful players were invited to the Superseries Finals, which were held at the end of each year.

Mixed doubles

  BWF Superseries Finals tournament
  BWF Superseries Premier tournament
  BWF Superseries tournament

BWF Grand Prix (7 titles, 7 runners-up) 
The BWF Grand Prix had two levels, the Grand Prix and Grand Prix Gold. It was a series of badminton tournaments sanctioned by the Badminton World Federation (BWF) and played between 2007 and 2017.

Women's doubles

Mixed doubles

  BWF Grand Prix Gold tournament
  BWF Grand Prix tournament

BWF International Challenge/Series (1 title, 1 runner-up) 
Mixed doubles

  BWF International Challenge tournament
  BWF International Series tournament

References

External links 
 

Living people
1991 births
Sportspeople from Gyeonggi Province
South Korean female badminton players
Universiade gold medalists for South Korea
Universiade medalists in badminton
Medalists at the 2011 Summer Universiade